Alice Goffman (born 1982) is an American sociologist, urban ethnographer, and author. She was Assistant Professor of Sociology at the University of Wisconsin and Visiting Assistant Professor of Sociology at Pomona College.

Goffman wrote On the Run: Fugitive Life in an American City about over-policing, poverty, and incarceration experienced by young black men and their families in Philadelphia, a best-selling book for which she received widespread praise before it was widely criticized. She was denied tenure at Wisconsin in 2019.

Education 
Goffman attended the Baldwin School in Bryn Mawr, Pennsylvania. She earned a BA at the University of Pennsylvania and a PhD at Princeton University, both in sociology. Her doctoral dissertation committee was chaired by Mitchell Duneier and included Paul DiMaggio, Devah Pager, Cornel West, and Viviana Zelizer.

Career 
While earning her PhD at Princeton, Goffman co-taught undergraduate courses with Mitch Duneier as a Lloyd Cotsen Graduate Teaching Fellow. In 2010, she was awarded a two-year fellowship at the University of Michigan as a Robert Wood Johnson Scholar. Beginning in the fall of 2012, Goffman taught both undergraduate and graduate level courses as an assistant professor at the University of Wisconsin-Madison. At Madison, she established the Wisconsin Collective for Ethnographic Research with a colleague and served on several committees.

She has served as a reviewer and board member for several different sociological publications.

In 2014, Goffman published On the Run: Fugitive Life in an American City, an ethnographic account of her fieldwork on the impact of policing on the lives of young black men in Northeast Philadelphia. Since the publication of On the Run, Goffman has delivered talks at dozens of colleges, universities and conferences. In March 2015 she gave a TED Talk titled "How we’re priming some kids for college – and others for prison."

In 2015, she was accepted to the one-year fellowship program at Princeton’s Institute for Advanced Study.

In April 2017, upon being offered a position as a Visiting Professor at Pomona College, an open letter was written by unnamed activists calling for her offer to be rescinded due to claims of racism in her work and research methods.

In 2019, she was denied tenure at University of Wisconsin-Madison.

On the Run 

On the Run: Fugitive Life in an American City (University of Chicago Press, 2014), began as a research project Goffman started as a second-year student at the University of Pennsylvania, when she immersed herself in a disadvantaged neighborhood of Philadelphia with African-American young men who were subject to a high level of surveillance and police activity. Goffman continued working on this project as a graduate student at Princeton, eventually turning it into her doctoral thesis and book. Issued in paperback in April 2015, the book uses the experience of Goffman's subjects to illustrate how young, black men are treated and mistreated by police within the framework of the American criminal justice system, and how this reshapes the lives of families in America's poor, black neighborhoods.

In the book’s introduction, Goffman highlights her central argument: "The sheer scope of policing and imprisonment in poor Black neighborhoods is transforming community life in ways that are deep and enduring, not only for the young men who are their targets but for their family members, partners, and neighbors."

Initial critical reception 

Many eminent sociologists and intellectuals, including Howard Becker, Elijah Anderson, Carol Stack and Cornel West, reviewed the book positively. West writes: "Alice Goffman's On the Run is the best treatment I know of the wretched underside of neo-liberal capitalist America. Despite the social misery and fragmented relations, she gives us a subtle analysis and poignant portrait of our fellow citizens who struggle to preserve their sanity and dignity."

On the Run was also positively received outside of academia. The book was named by The New York Times as one of "100 notable books of 2014." The New York Times Book Review also named it as an "Editor's Choice" selection in its edition of July 6, 2014. In The New York Times, Alex Kotlowitz called it "a remarkable feat of reporting." Writing in The New York Review of Books, Christopher Jencks predicted that the work will become "an ethnographic classic."

The book continued to gain popularity following Goffman’s TED Talk, which has over 2 million views and has been widely circulated online. The TED Talk describes the consequences of incarceration and policing for marginalized young people, calling for an end to mass incarceration and highlighting the need for criminal justice reform in America. Goffman’s argument that "tough on crime" policing has done more harm than good has resounded with many advocates for reform on social media.

From the right, conservative law professor Amy Wax argued that "[Goffman] puts her finger on the wrong button. The force field that deforms 6th Street is not society’s effort to eradicate crime, but crime itself."

On the left, Dwayne Betts in Slate criticized Goffman for ignoring the lives of quiet achievement lived by most young men in the neighborhood she studied in favor of an "unrelenting focus on criminality."  Christina Sharpe in The New Inquiry criticized Goffman for failing to fully understand and acknowledge the power structures at work during her fieldwork, and criticised the positive critical reception of the book for elevating the work of a white scholar over important contributions by black scholars. In addition, some reviewers have accused Goffman, as a white upper-class woman, of writing "jungle book" tropes about the lives of poor African-American young men.

Allegations of data fabrication and criminal conduct 

Many parties have criticized On the Run for alleged factual inaccuracy and Goffman's alleged felonious conduct. Legal ethicist Steven Lubet, reviewing On the Run in The New Rambler, claimed that Goffman had admitted to committing conspiracy to commit murder and "involved her[self] as an accomplice in the evident commission of a major felony" in a passage describing the aftermath of the murder of one of her sources. Following Goffman's response, he claimed that "Goffman essentially admits that she embellished and exaggerated her account of a crucial episode, which should leave even the most sympathetic readers doubting her word."  Lubet revisited On the Run in his 2017 book Interrogating Ethnography: Why Evidence Matters.

Lubet also questioned Goffman's claim, which he called "outlandish," that she had personally witnessed police officers making arrests after running the names of visitors to hospitals. Yale law professor James Forman Jr. wrote that he "had never heard of such a thing. When I spoke with civil-rights attorneys and public defenders in New York, Philadelphia, and Washington, D.C., and with a police official in New Haven, Connecticut, I couldn’t find a single person who knew of a case like Alex and Donna’s." Journalist Dan McQuade of Philadelphia magazine was similarly unable to verify Goffman's assertion. Lubet also questioned a claim that one of Goffman's sources, 'Tim', had at the age of eleven been placed on three years of juvenile probation on the charge of "accessory" to receiving stolen property, after being arrested as a passenger in a stolen car.

Reporter Jesse Singal located some of the anonymized subjects of the book and interviewed them. He came to the conclusion that "her book is, at the very least, mostly true", though he was unable to obtain precise details of the hospital arrest incident or the arrest of the juvenile 'Tim'. Singal wrote that "Lubet's skepticism seems well-founded", and concluded that "the most likely explanation for these discrepancies is that [Goffman] simply didn't heed her own advice about credulously echoing sources' stories; it might be that important details about how these events unfolded got lost along the way."

In his lengthy review of the book and the controversy, law professor Paul Campos said there were "numerous and significant incongruities, contradictions, inaccuracies, and improbable incidents scattered throughout" the text and that Goffman's book "reveals flaws in the way social science in general, and ethnography in particular, is produced." To take one example, he was highly skeptical of Goffman's description of an incident where a man was shot and killed in her presence. Campos asked whether "a friend of Chuck's [was] actually murdered before Goffman's eyes, forcing her to run away, with blood spattering her shoes and pants? Did she avoid being questioned by the police, who, one presumes, would have discovered both a body and Goffman's car when they arrived on the scene? How is it that having someone murdered right in front of her merits no more than one almost throwaway sentence in her book?"

The popularity of On the Run in the mainstream media has put the practice of ethnography under scrutiny. Journalist Gideon Lewis-Kraus published a longform defense of Goffman's book in The New York Times Magazine, in which he argued that most sociologists consider the alleged errors found in On the Run to be the inevitable result of her university's Institutional Review Board requirement that informants be anonymized and field notes be destroyed.

An anonymous 57-page critique of On the Run was circulated on academic list-servs claiming that Goffman had fabricated many of the incidents she described. University of Wisconsin-Madison reviewed the anonymous allegations and found them to be "without merit". Journalist Lewis-Kraus read a detailed refutation to the critique composed and shown to him by Goffman, although she has declined to share it with the public. He writes that she "persuasively explains many of the lingering issues" but that "the hardest elements of her story to confirm are the ones that feel like cinematic exaggerations, especially with respect to police practices; several officers challenged as outlandish her claim that she was personally interrogated with guns on the table."  Goffman, when asked for corroboration, disagreed with what she considered was Lewis-Kraus' assumption "[t]he way to validate the claims in the book is by getting officials who are white men in power to corroborate them.... The point of the book is for people who are written off and delegitimated to describe their own lives and to speak for themselves about the reality they face, and this is a reality that goes absolutely against the narratives of officials or middle-class people. So finding 'legitimate' people to validate the claims — it feels wrong to me on just about every level." Singal felt that this "only gets [Goffman] so far: It's not like you can't both tell your subjects' stories and check certain details for consistency along the way."

Goffman's publishers told The New York Times that they stand behind Goffman and her book. Goffman's thesis adviser at Princeton, Mitchell Duneier, defended the portion of Goffman's work which is in her thesis, telling The Chronicle of Higher Education that he met with and verified the identities of some of her informants.

In The Chronicle of Higher Education, sociologist Jack Katz also addressed the ethical dilemmas that accompany Goffman's brand of ethnography: "Most of the time, people doing research on drugs and crime and the police don't report the incidents that potentially compromise them. The ethical line she crossed, in a way, was honesty." Columbia sociologist Shamus Khan stated that "I don't think Alice made up any data. I think there are questions about reporting things she heard as if they were things she saw (which she is hardly unique in doing – most people do this, but they definitely should not)." Andrew Gelman wrote that "Goffman's success, and the reputation of her work, depend crucially on the trust of her audience. Once that trust is gone, I think it's very hard to get it back. I think she'll have to move into an arena in which she can document her work, or else move into some field such as advocacy in which documented truth is not required."

Awards 
 2011 Dissertation Award, American Sociological Association, for "the best PhD dissertation for a calendar year."
 2010 Jane Addams Award for Best Article, Community and Urban Section of the American Sociological Association, for "On The Run: Wanted Men in a Philadelphia Ghetto" published in the American Sociological Review.

Personal life 
Goffman is the daughter of sociologist Erving Goffman and sociolinguist Gillian Sankoff, both Canadian emigrants to the United States. American linguist William Labov is also her adoptive father.

See also 
 Chicago school (sociology)
 Urban anthropology
 Urban sociology

References

External links 
 
 On the Run webpage, University of Chicago Press
 
 The Trials of Alice Goffman at NYTimes

1982 births
Living people
20th-century American Jews
American people of Canadian descent
American people of Ukrainian-Jewish descent
American sociologists
American women sociologists
American ethnographers
American non-fiction writers
University of Wisconsin–Madison faculty
Princeton University alumni
University of Pennsylvania alumni
Scientists from Philadelphia
Writers from Philadelphia
The Baldwin School alumni
Pomona College faculty
21st-century American Jews
20th-century American women
21st-century American women